Edaganasalai is a Municipality in Salem district  in the state of Tamil Nadu, India.

Demographics
 India census, Edaganasalai had a population of 29,593. Males constitute 54% of the population and females 46%. Edaganasalai has an average literacy rate of 50%, lower than the national average of 59.5%: male literacy is 59% and, female literacy is 39%. In Edaganasalai, 12% of the population is under 6 years of age.
culture:
Hinduism is major religion here, ammankovil is the well known temple here and it is famous for pulliyattam before 40 years, at the time of car festival people play with the lepored, captured  by the village municheif. The siddaswaran temple which is a well known temple in Salem district also located here.this are is famous illampillai art silk.one of the leading textile area.

References

Cities and towns in Salem district